Vrij Nederland (Free Netherlands) is a Dutch magazine, established during the German occupation of the Netherlands in World War II as an underground newspaper. It has since grown into a magazine. The originally weekly turned monthly magazine in 2016 is traditionally intellectually left-wing. Over the years, it has become more centrist. It is one of the four most influential written media in its sector, along with Elsevier, De Groene Amsterdammer and HP/De Tijd, all with a sdwindling readership. Publisher of Vrij Nederland is WPG Uitgevers in Amsterdam. The offices of Vrij Nederland are in the headquarters of WPG the Wibautstraat 133.

The first issue was published on 31 August 1940. The chief editors were:
 1940–1942: Frans Hofker
 1941–1950: Henk van Randwijk
 1950–1955: Johan Winkler
 1955–1969: 
 1969–1991: Rinus Ferdinandusse
 1991–1997: Joop van Tijn
 1998–2000: Oscar Garschagen
 2001–2004: Xandra Schutte
 2004–2005: Gerard van Westerloo (interim)
 2005–2008: Emile Fallaux
 2008–2015: Frits van Exter
 2017–present: Ward Wijndelts

Circulation:
 1945: 109,000
 1951: 35,000
 1955: 19,000
 1960: 23,000
 1965: 36,950
 1970: 81,378
 1975: 109,381
 1980: 111,857
 1985: 97,132
 1990: 76,947
 1995: 92,134
 2000: 55,947
 2005: 49,244 
 2010: 48,353 
 2015: 22,937
 2020: 17,043
 2021: 15,542

External links
 
 WorldCat record

1940 establishments in the Netherlands
Dutch-language magazines
Dutch resistance newspapers
Weekly magazines published in the Netherlands
Political magazines published in the Netherlands
Magazines established in 1940